The State of Syria was a French Mandate state created by decree of 5 December 1924, with effect from 1 January 1925, from the union of the State of Aleppo and the State of Damascus. It was the successor of the Syrian Federation (1922–1924) which had been created by providing a central assembly for the State of Aleppo, the State of Damascus and the Alawite State. The Alawite State did not join the State of Syria.

Background 

In 1920, an independent Arab Kingdom of Syria was established under King Faisal of the Hashemite family, who later became the King of Iraq. However, his rule over Syria ended after only a few months, following the clash between his Syrian Arab forces and regular French forces at the Battle of Maysalun. French troops occupied Syria later that year after the League of Nations put Syria under French mandate.

History of Syria under the Mandate

Initial civil administration
Following the San Remo conference and the defeat of King Faisal's short-lived monarchy in Syria at the Battle of Maysalun, the French general Henri Gouraud established civil administration in the territory. The mandate region was subdivided into six states. The drawing of those states was based in part on the sectarian make up on the ground in Syria. However, nearly all the Syrian sects were hostile to the French mandate and to the division it created.

The primarily Sunni population of Aleppo and Damascus were strongly opposed to the division of Syria.

Syrian Federation (1922–24)

On 28 June 1922, the Syrian Federation was created between three of the states: the State of Damascus, the State of Aleppo and the Alawite State. Jabal Druze and Greater Lebanon were not parts of this federation. The autonomous Sanjak of Alexandretta was added to the state of Aleppo in 1923. The Federation adopted a new federal flag (green-white-green with French canton), which later became the flag of the State of Syria.

State of Syria

The Alawite state seceded from the federation in 1924. The states of Aleppo and Damascus were united into the State of Syria, with effect on 1 January 1925.

General revolt

In 1925, Syrian resistance to French colonial rule broke out in full scale revolt, led by Sultan Pasha el Atrash.

The revolt broke out in Jabal Druze but quickly spread to other Syrian states and became a general rebellion in Syria. France tried to retaliate by having the parliament of Aleppo declare secession from the union with Damascus, but the voting was foiled by Syrian patriots.

Despite French attempts to maintain control by encouraging sectarian divisions and isolating urban and rural areas, the revolt spread from the countryside and united Syrian Druze, Sunnis, Shiites, Alawis, and Christians. Once the rebel forces had besieged Damascus, the French military responded with brutal counter-insurgency techniques that prefigured those that would be used later in Algeria and Indo-China. These techniques included house demolitions, collective punishments of towns, executions, population transfers, and the use of heavy armor in urban neighborhoods. The revolt was eventually subdued in 1926-27 via French aerial bombardment of civilian areas, including Damascus.

Republic of Syria

On May 14, 1930, the State of Syria was declared the Republic of Syria and a new constitution was drafted.

Government
While the State enjoyed a certain degree of autonomy as a Mandate, France exercised significant authority over the government. The revolt that began in Jabal Druze led to France easing their hold on Syria and  a constitution was drafted but not ratified by the French Chamber of Duties, and the coming of World War II stopped any progress in Syrian self-determination.

Education
Under French administration, the University of Damascus, known then as Syrian University was established in 1923, teaching in Arabic. It was the first university to be founded in Syria, being established through the merger of the School of Medicine and the Institute of Law, founded 1903 and 1913 respectively during the Ottoman era.

See also 
History of Syria
French Colonial Empire
List of French possessions and colonies

References

Bibliography

External links 
Timeline of the French Mandate period
 Mandat Syrie-Liban ... (1920-1946)
 La Syrie et le mandat français (1920-1946)
 Les Relations franco-libanaises dans le cadre des relations Internationales
 Mandat français au Proche-Orient

French Mandate for Syria and the Lebanon
1920s in Mandatory Syria
1930 in Mandatory Syria
Former countries in the Middle East
States and territories established in 1924
States and territories disestablished in 1930
1925 establishments in Asia
1930 disestablishments in Asia
1925 establishments in the French colonial empire
1930 disestablishments in the French colonial empire
Former countries of the interwar period